Tuyana Norpolovna Dashidorzhieva (born 14 April 1996) is a Russian competitive archer of Buryat ethnicity. She helped her fellow compatriots and experienced Olympians Ksenia Perova and Inna Stepanova secure a historic team recurve title at the 2015 World Championships in Copenhagen, a silver at the 2016 Summer Olympics in Rio de Janeiro, and a bronze at the 2015 Summer Universiade in Gwangju, completing a full set of medals throughout her sporting career in a major international competition.

Dashidorzhieva rose to prominence in the global archery scene at the 2015 Summer Universiade in Gwangju, South Korea. There, she and her compatriots Stepanova and Anna Balsukova teamed up to defeat Mexico 6–2 for their bronze-medal triumph in the women's team recurve tournament.

Shortly after the Universiade, Dashidorzhieva contributed to the Russian trio's performance by narrowly dispatching the Indian women in a tie-breaker to end a 28-year-old interlude for their country's historic team recurve crown, and secure a full quota place for Rio 2016 at the World Championships in Copenhagen, Denmark.

Dashidorzhieva was selected to compete for the Russian squad at the 2016 Summer Olympics in Rio de Janeiro, shooting in both individual and team recurve tournaments. First, Dashidorzhieva discharged 654 points to lead the Russian trio for the fifth seed heading to the knockout draw, along with her team's score of 1,938 attained in the classification round. Sitting behind the South Koreans at second position in the women's team recurve, Dashidorzhieva and her teammates Stepanova and Perova could not overthrow their opponents from a possible historic streak of eight Olympic titles, as the Russian trio ended the tournament by taking the silver instead at 1–5. Few days later, in the women's individual recurve, Dashidorzhieva fought valiantly to dispose Bhutan's Karma (7–3) from the opening round, before she succumbed to a 4–6 defeat in her subsequent match from the unheralded Chinese archer Cao Hui.

References

External links
 

Russian female archers
Living people
People from Chita, Zabaykalsky Krai
1996 births
Buryat sportspeople
World Archery Championships medalists
Archers at the 2016 Summer Olympics
Olympic archers of Russia
Olympic medalists in archery
Olympic silver medalists for Russia
Medalists at the 2016 Summer Olympics
Universiade medalists in archery
Universiade bronze medalists for Russia
Medalists at the 2015 Summer Universiade
Medalists at the 2017 Summer Universiade
Sportspeople from Zabaykalsky Krai